Vallis Schrödinger (Latin for "Schrödinger Valley") is a long, nearly linear valley that lies on the far side of the Moon. It is oriented radially to the huge Schrödinger basin and most likely was formed during the original impact that created Schrödinger.

The valley is shaped like a long groove in the lunar surface. It begins at the outer rampart of ejecta surrounding Schrödinger and continues to the north-northwest until it crosses the rim of the crater Moulton. About mid-way along its length it crosses the crater Sikorsky, and is overlaid in turn by the small satellite crater Sikorsky Q.

It varies in width from 8–10 km. The valley was named after the crater Schrödinger, which itself is named for Erwin Schrödinger.

Schrödinger, Vallis
Erwin Schrödinger